The 1999 Thailand Masters was a professional ranking snooker tournament that took place between 1–7 March 1999 at the Ambassador Hotel in Bangkok, Thailand.

Mark Williams retained the title by winning in the final 9–7 against Alan McManus.


Wildcard round

Main draw

Final

References

1999 in snooker